is the second compilation album by the Japanese girl band Princess Princess, released on August 25, 1994, by Sony Records. It consists of B-sides and deep cuts selected by the band's fans. The album was packaged in a box designed like a shipping box, while the CD was designed to resemble an LP.

The album peaked at No. 3 on Oricon's albums chart. It was also certified Gold by the RIAJ.

Track listing 
All music is composed by Kaori Okui, except where indicated; all music is arranged by Princess Princess.

Charts

Certification

References

External links
 
 

Princess Princess (band) compilation albums
1994 compilation albums
Compilation albums by Japanese artists
Sony Music Entertainment Japan compilation albums
Japanese-language compilation albums